Richard Brown or Browne may refer to:

Arts and entertainment
Richard Browne (fl. 1614–1629), English composer and organist
Richard Browne (c. 1630–1664), English composer and organist
Richard Browne (d. 1710), English composer and organist
 Richard "Rabbit" Brown (1880–1937), early US blues musician and composer
 Richard Shaw Brown (born 1947), lead singer of The Misunderstood
 Rich Brown (blues musician), American blues musician and singer
 Richard Browne (painter) (1776–1824), early Australian convict artist and illustrator
Richard Brown (producer), Scottish television producer
 Richard Brown, British musician, original drummer for the new wave-post-punk band Modern English

Sportsmen
 Richard Brown (cricketer) (1811–?), English cricketer and clergyman
 Richard Brown (footballer) (born 1967), retired English footballer
 Richard Brown (rugby union) (born 1984), Australian rugby union footballer
 Richard Brown (linebacker) (born 1965), former American football linebacker
 Richard Brown (center) (1907–1990), played for Portsmouth Spartans
 Ricky Brown (born 1983), American football player
 Ricky Brown (tennis) (born 1967), retired American tennis player
 Richard Browne (hurler) (born 1962), retired Irish sportsman
 Richard Browne (athletics) (born 1991), USA sprint runner and high jumper
 Ricky Browne (born 1950), Australian rules footballer for Geelong
 Richard Browne (footballer) (born 1946), Australian rules footballer for Hawthorn
 Stub Brown (Richard P. Brown, 1870–1948), pitcher in Major League Baseball
 Richard Cameron "Cam" Brown (born 1969), retired ice hockey left winger

Politicians
 Richard Brown (Canadian politician) (born 1956)
 Sir Richard Browne, 1st Baronet, of Deptford (c. 1605–1682/83), English ambassador to the court of France
 Sir Richard Browne, 1st Baronet, of London (c. 1610–1669), Major-General in the English Parliamentary army; Lord Mayor of London
 Richard C. Brown (1939–2004), United States Ambassador to Uruguay, 1990–1993
 Richard Browne (died 1604) (c. 1538–1604), MP for Lichfield, Newton (Isle of Wight), Cirencester and Harwich
 Richard Browne (died 1614?), MP for Steyning, Arundel, Lewes, Gatton and Midhurst
 Richard Lewis Brown (1854–1948), builder and state politician in Florida
 Dick Brown (politician) (1887–1971), member of the Queensland Legislative Assembly
 Richard Brown (Ohio politician), member of the Ohio House of Representatives
 Richard Brown (lawyer) (1932–2019), American attorney and politician from the state of New York
 Rich Brown (Michigan politician) (born 1956), member of the Michigan House of Representatives
Richard Brown (Missouri politician), member of the Missouri House of Representatives

Others
 Richard Brown (captain) (1753–1833), shipmaster and friend of Robert Burns
 Richard Brown (journalist), Canadian television journalist
 Richard Brown (professor) (c. 1712–?), academic at the University of Oxford
 Richard Brown (transport executive) (born 1953), British chief transport executive & chairman of Eurostar
 Richard D. Brown (born 1939), American historian and professor emeritus at the University of Connecticut
 Richard Hart Brown (1941–2005), Intraoperative Neurological Monitoring founder and amusement ride safety expert
 Richard S. Brown (born 1946), Chief Judge of the Wisconsin Court of Appeals
 Sir Richard Browne, 2nd Baronet (before 1634–1684), barrister
 Richard H. Brown, American businessman and CEO
 Richard Brown, rocket developer of Corpulent Stump
 Richard Brown, openSUSE Chairman

See also
 Rick Brown (disambiguation)
 Dick Brown (disambiguation)
 Richard Broun (disambiguation)
 Brown (surname)